Goworowice  (German: Gauers) is a village in the administrative district of Gmina Kamiennik, within Nysa County, Opole Voivodeship, in south-western Poland.

The village has a population of 370.

References

Goworowice